Galenic may refer to:

 Galen (129 CE – c. 200/c. 216 CE), ancient Greek physician
 Galenic formulation, the principles of preparing and compounding medicines in order to optimize their absorption, named after Galen